The Beaver River is a river in the far north of Kenora District in Northwestern Ontario, Canada. It is part of the Hudson Bay drainage basin, and is a left tributary of the Severn River.

Course

References

Sources

Rivers of Kenora District
Tributaries of Hudson Bay